Lael Wilcox (born July 18, 1987) is an ultra-endurance bicycle racer who won the Trans Am Bike Race in 2016, and set Tour Divide's women's course record on an individual time trial (ITT) in 2015. She was the first American to win the Trans Am. She also set the overall course record with her time on the Baja Divide route.

Personal
Wilcox grew up in Anchorage, Alaska. She graduated from the University of Puget Sound in 2008 with degrees in natural science and French literature.

Wilcox started bicycling in 2008 at age 20, when she and her then boyfriend, Nicholas Carman, decided to tour the world. Working stints to collect money, the two set out on a bicycle tour of over thirty countries. They started in North America, then traveled in Eastern Europe, the Middle East, and Africa, logging over 100,000 miles.

Wilcox and Carman separated in 2017. In May 2021 Wilcox married "Rue" Rugile Kaladyte, a photojournalist who has documented many of Wilcox's rides.

Initiatives and sponsorships 
In the 2015-2016 winter and spring, Wilcox and Carman co-developed the off-pavement bikepacking Baja Divide route, which runs from San Diego, California through San Jose del Cabo and on to La Paz, Baja California Sur, Mexico.

As of 2016, Wilcox and Carman, along with Wilcox's mother, Dawn Wilcox, taught biking skills and repair bicycles for elementary school children in Anchorage. They also ran a program to collect bikes to donate to schoolchildren. As of 2018-2019, Lael co-leads Anchorage GRIT to get more local girls on bikes, and talks about it and other programs. In 2018 Wilcox began the Lael Rides Alaska Women's Scholarship.

As of 2018-2020, Wilcox has general sponsorships from Specialized and Revelate Designs.

Racing
Wilcox first became interested in racing in 2014 when she and Carman were in Israel. The pair heard about and entered the Holyland Challenge, a 1000-mile unsupported race across the country. She was both the youngest rider and the only woman. She led the race by 25 miles the first day, and although she did not win the race, she was firmly focused on endurance racing.

Trans Am
In 2016, Wilcox participated in the 4,400 mile Trans Am Bike Race that crosses the United States from west to east. As a small woman dressed in non-cycling clothes and with very little road-racing experience, she was not expected to compete, much less win. She averaged 235 miles per day for 18 days, averaging less than 5 hours of sleep per night. On the final morning, she trailed Steffen Streich by 40 miles. That morning, Streich awoke and mistakenly started riding west. Wilcox met Streich in Bumpass, Virginia. Streich suggested they ride to the finish together, and Wilcox responded, "This is a race" and sprinted the final 130 miles to the coast to become the first woman and the first American to win the race. Wilcox sprinted the final hours to win the race in 18 days and ten minutes.

Tour Divide
In 2015, Wilcox, still considered relatively inexperienced at road racing, broke the women's record on the Tour Divide by more than two days. She covered the 2,745 mile race in 17 days, 1 hour and 51 minutes in spite of stopping off for an emergency room visit due to a respiratory infection.

Baja Divide
In 2015, Wilcox set the women's record for the fastest time on the Baja Divide route. In 2017, she broke the men's record as well.

Navad 1000
In 2018, Wilcox became only the second female to complete Switzerland's Navad 1000 bikepacking race, finishing in second place. The race features 627 miles distance and 99,770 feet of climbing. Lael's race was commemorated in the film I'm Not Stopping produced by Rugile Kaladyte.

References

Living people
American female cyclists
Ultra-distance cyclists
University of Puget Sound alumni
People from Anchorage, Alaska
21st-century American women
1987 births